Levallois Sporting Club Football is a French football club founded in 1894. They are based in Levallois-Perret, France. Former Chelsea striker Didier Drogba played youth football with Levallois and they have named their new Stadium after Didier Drogba.

From 2002 to 2006, the club played at the fifth level of French football, the Championnat de France Amateurs 2 and were promoted after finishing third in their group.

Levallois reached the 1/16-finals of the 2000–01 Coupe de France, losing 0–1 to ES Wasquehal.

The club ceased playing senior football in 2009, merging it's senior team into that of Racing Club de France Football.

See also 
Levallois Sporting Club

References 

 
Association football clubs established in 1941
1941 establishments in France
Sport in Hauts-de-Seine
Football clubs in Paris